The People's Army of Vietnam Special Forces Arms, officially the Special Operation Force Arms or Special Operation Arms, is the elite combat armed service of the People's Army of Vietnam, led by the General Staff of the Vietnam People's Army. It is uniquely organized, equipped, and trained with special fighting skills, bravery and heroism, resourcefulness and boldness to attack and destroy key enemy’s targets.

The SOF has the task of focusing on researching and advising the Ministry of Defence to build and develop Vietnamese special forces capabilities.

History

Pre-history 
In the 13th century, during the Mongol invasions of Vietnam, the Trần army developed a way of ambushing with small, elite forces, good at fighting on land, on rivers, and at sea. Trần Quốc Tuấn has directed: "Being reckless on the boat is not as good as stabbing under the boat, destroying the enemy's army is not as good as destroying the enemy's boat". Implementing that direction, General Yết Kiêu organized and trained Trạo Nhi teams consisting of strong and good swimmers who specialized in destroying the enemy's naval base. In many battles, the Trạo Nhi team secretly entered the naval base, burned the boat with flammable substances and dived into the muddy water, destroyed many Mongol troops in Chương Dương, Phả Lại, and Chí Linh and once captured them live the enemy general.

In 1410, Trần Nguyên Hãn utilized the doctrine of "Quân cốt tinh, không cốt nhiều" ("The core of an army is its quality, not quantity") and organized a famous battle with nearly 200 insurgents, stripped naked and camouflaged, and secretly infiltrated the Xương Giang citadel, Việt Trì to attack the Ming army in the citadel.

First Indochina War 
On the Southern battlefield, France strengthened the construction of a system of posts around towns and cities and on important roads in order to encircle, separate and hinder the Viet Minh armed forces. Through many successful trials, especially the battle to destroy Bà Kiên bridge post in the night of March 18 and early morning, March 19, 1948, opened a new possibility to defeat the enemy in a solid entrenched position.

In November 1949,  Military Region 7 command held a symposium on fighting the watchtower with the participation of officers and soldiers who had participated in fighting the watchtower and proposed a new way of fighting the watchtower. With the FT wall-breaking weapon (Trái phá FT), on the night of March 21 to the morning of March 23, 1950, on the battlefield of Biên Hòa, 50 battle groups simultaneously used FT to attack 50 watchtowers, causing great confusion for the enemy. From this battle, the Biên Hòa Provincial Army and the General Staff of Military Region 7 held a conference to learn from experience and use commando tactics.

The South focused on research and development, constantly perfecting commando tactics. Stemming from the combat mission and the enemy's goals, units in the South had a new development with an increasingly large scale. A commando battle is organized with 3 components: ground commando, water commando, and mobile special forces with the common organizational scale of team, battalion, standing at the base across strategic locations.

During the last period of the First Indochina War and during the Battle of Dien Bien Phu, the Viet Minh developed on the battlefields, had a knack for fighting in the enemy's rear, initially gained experience in synergistic warfare in the area. campaigns. The special forces fought the enemy on both front and rear. Some typical battles of the commando troops such as Phú Thọ bombing, Tân An bomb depot, Cát Bi airport, Gia Lam Airport.

Vietnam War 
After the 1954 Geneva Conference was signed, the Communist Party of Vietnam and army selected and sent special forces from the North to the South to build up forces and fight. In June 1958, the Southeast Command was established and the Eastern armed forces had a special commando company with the code name 60th Company. This was the first commando company in the South. Company 60, along with special commando groups and groups in the localities, began to attack Republic of Vietnam government buildings and posts.

In September 1962, specialized commando teams began to enter the southern battlefields, supplementing combat units in military zones and provinces. In the two years 1961 - 1962, 10 specialized commando companies, 1 mobile battalion with 1,122 men were reinforced for zone 5 and the South. The birth and rapid development of mobile and specialized commando forces in the North marked a new development in the organization of special forces troops.

During the period of the implementation of the Staley–Taylor Plan, one of the most prominent features of special operations was that for the first time, participated in combat with the main army in special operations campaign quality and won many victories. Some typical battles during this period were the destruction of the Plây Cơ Rông commando base, the raid on Pleiku airport and the American barracks Holloway, the Brinks Hotel bombing, the Attack on USNS Card. The feats of North Vietnamese commandos in the period of counter-strategy Staley–Taylor Plan marked an important development of the art of combat behind hostile lines to destroy the enemy's forces the headquarters and center of war operations of the US-RVN.

During the 1968 Tet Offensive, North Vietnamese commandos led the attack on ARVN headquarters and vital installations in most South Vietnamese cities, contributing to a 1968 Mậu Thân victory, creating a turning point in the Vietnam War. The commandos were also used during the Battle of Lima Site 85, successfully overrunning a US post in Laos, and the Battle of FSB Mary Ann where they hurled satchels at command bunkers, knifed sleeping soldiers, and destroyed all communications equipment, killing 33 US soldiers in the process at a loss of 15 men.

On November 1, 1968, a successful raid involving swimmer sappers severely damaged the USS Westchester County (LST-1167), seeing the US Navy’s greatest single-incident combat loss of life during the entire Vietnam War. While the ship was docked at My Tho, sappers carrying two 250 kg mines swam up and planted them on the lower hull, detonating them. Consequently, 25 sailors were killed and another 27 wounded. Such attacks were highly effective, with 88 successful attacks between 1962 and 1969 killing 210 personnel and wounding another 325 in return for only 20 sappers killed or captured.

The Pochentong raid 
On the night of 21–22 January 1971, a hundred or so-strong PAVN "Sapper" Commando force (equivalent of "spec op" in English) managed to pass undetected through the defensive perimeter of the Special Military Region ( – RMS) set by the Cambodian Army around Phnom Penh and carried out a spectacular raid on Pochentong airbase. Broken into six smaller detachments armed mostly with AK-47 assault rifles and RPG-7 anti-tank rocket launchers, the PAVN raiders succeeded in scaling the barbed-wire fence and quickly overwhelmed the poorly armed airmen of the Security Battalion on duty that night. Once inside the facility, the raiders unleashed a furious barrage of small-arms fire and rocket-propelled grenades against any aircraft they found on the parking area adjacent to the runway and nearby buildings; one of the commando teams even scaled the adjoining commercial terminal of the civilian airport and after taking position at the international restaurant located on the roof, they fired a rocket into the napalm supply depot near the RVNAF apron.

When the smoke cleared the next morning, the Khmer Air Force had been virtually annihilated. A total of 69 aircraft stationed at Pochentong at the time were either completely destroyed or severely damaged on the ground, including many T-28D Trojans, nearly all the Shenyang, MiG, T-37B and Fouga Magister jets, all the L-19A Bird Dogs and An-2 transports, the UH-1 helicopter gunships, three VNAF O-1 Bird Dogs and even a VIP transport recently presented to President Lon Nol by the South Vietnamese government. Apart from the aircraft losses, 39 AVNK officers and enlisted men had lost their lives and another 170 were injured. The only airframes that escaped destruction were six T-28D Trojans temporarily deployed to Battambang, ten GY-80 Horizon light trainers (also stationed at Battambang), eight Alouette II and Alouette III helicopters, two Sikorsky H-34 helicopters, one T-37B jet trainer, and a single Fouga Magister jet that had been grounded for repairs. Pochentong airbase was closed for almost a week while the damage was assessed, wreckage removed, the runway repaired, and the stocks of fuel and ammunitions replenished.

Similar raids occurred the following year against U-Tapao Airfield which housed Boeing B-52 Stratofortress bombers, with three bombers being damaged and a Thai sentry killed.

Training of foreign commando units in Southeast Asia and Latin America

The effectiveness of the Dac Cong during the Vietnam War saw them instruct various other countries and Marxist rebel groups. From the 1970s to 1990s, they covertly provided training at the PAVN Special Forces School in Vietnam, by Vietnamese advisors assigned to the Cuban Army’s Sapper School in Cuba, and, during the 1980s, by a secret Vietnamese sapper training team stationed in Nicaragua.  In addition to training Cambodian, Laotian, Soviet, and Cuban military personnel, their publications revealed that among the foreign revolutionary forces that received training in sapper tactics, bomb-making, and the use of weapons and explosives, were members of the Marxist El Salvadoran FMLN (Farabundo Marti National Liberation Front), the Chilean MIR (Movement of the Revolutionary Left) fighting against the dictatorial regime of Augusto Pinochet, as well as the Colombian FARC (Revolutionary Armed Forces of Colombia) movement, a Marxist guerilla group that was also heavily involved in narcotics trafficking.

Organization
The current special forces units under Special Forces Command included:
113th Commando Brigade (3 times being awarded the Hero of the People's Armed Forces in 1975, 1979, 2000) stationed in Vinh Phuc
27th Commando Battalion
9th Commando Battalion (Reserve)
45th Commando Battalion (Training)
11th Counter-Terrorist Company (Reserve)
12th Counter-Terrorist Company
Reconnaissance Company
Fires Platoon
198th Commando Brigade (established in 1974) stationed in Dak Lak
20th Commando Battalion
37th Commando Battalion
35th Commando Battalion (Training)
10th Counter-Terrorist Company
Reconnaissance Company
Fires Platoon
429th Commando Brigade stationed in Binh Duong
8th Commando Battalion
9th Commando Battalion
15th Commando Battalion (Training)
10th Counter-Terrorist Company
Reconnaissance Company
Fires Platoon
The current maritime special forces unit include the 5th Maritime Commando Brigade stationed in Ninh Thuan
1st Marinetime Commando Battalion
2nd Marinetime Commando Battalion
3rd Marinetime Commando Battalion
7th Marinetime Commando Battalion (Training)
10th Counter-Terrorist Company
11th Frogman Company (Reserve)
12th Frogman Company
Reconnaissance Company
Fires Platoon
Boats Company
The special task force currently have the 1st Special Operations Brigade (M1 Brigade) stationed in Hanoi. Under the brigade direct command were company-level units:
54th Special Operations Company
10th Special Operations Company (Reserve)
7th Counter-Terrorist Company
74th Counter-Terrorist Company (Reserve)
Airborne Platoon
Reconnaissance Company
Fires Platoon
Aside from the Special Forces Command, Each Military Region and Corps have their own Commando Battalion under their staff command. Vietnam People's Navy have 126th Naval Special Operations Brigade stationed in Hai Phong
1st Naval Special Operations Battalion
2nd Naval Special Operations Battalion
3rd Naval Special Operations Battalion
4th Naval Special Operations Battalion (Training)
Counter-Terrorist Company
Frogman Company
Frogman Company (Reserve)

Reconnaissance Company
Fires Platoon
Boats Company

Equipments

Weapons

Vehicles

Aircraft

Notes

Special forces of Vietnam
Military units and formations of the People's Army of Vietnam